This was the first edition of the tournament.

Adrián Menéndez Maceiras won the title after defeating Danilo Petrović 1–6, 7–5, 6–3 in the final.

Seeds

Draw

Finals

Top half

Bottom half

References
Main Draw
Qualifying Draw

Puerto Vallarta - Singles